Zhang Shubin (born February 16, 1966, in Harbin) is a Chinese former competitive figure skater. He is the 1985 Winter Universiade champion, 1986 Asian Winter Games silver medalist, and 1986 Fujifilm Trophy bronze medalist. He placed 20th at the 1988 Winter Olympics in Calgary and 25th at the 1992 Winter Olympics in Albertville. He retired from competitive skating in 1992 and became a coach. He is the father of American businessman Raymond Zhang.

Results

References
 
 Skatabase: 1988 Winter Olympics

Chinese male single skaters
1966 births
Living people
Figure skaters from Harbin
Olympic figure skaters of China
Figure skaters at the 1992 Winter Olympics
Figure skaters at the 1988 Winter Olympics
Asian Games medalists in figure skating
Figure skaters at the 1986 Asian Winter Games

Medalists at the 1986 Asian Winter Games
Asian Games silver medalists for China
Universiade medalists in figure skating
Universiade gold medalists for China
Competitors at the 1985 Winter Universiade